John Parsons may refer to:

Politicians
John Parsons (died 1717) (1639–1717), English MP for Reigate
John Parsons (1667-c.1706), English MP for Reigate
John Parsons (Newfoundland politician) (1868–1949), Canadian mariner, merchant and politician
John Langdon Parsons (1837–1903), Cornish Australian politician
John M. Parsons (1866–1946), politician in the Senate of Virginia
John S. Parsons (1836–1911), mayor of Gloucester, Massachusetts

Others
John Parsons (organist) (1563–1623), organist at Westminster Abbey
John Parsons (bishop) (1761–1819), Vice-Chancellor of Oxford University
John Meeson Parsons (1798–1870), art collector
John Parsons (missionary) (1817–1869), English missionary and reviser of the Hindi Bible
John Edward Parsons (1829–1915), lawyer in New York City
John Denham Parsons (1861–?), writer
John Herbert Parsons (1863–1957), English ophthalmologist
Jack Parsons (cricketer) (1890–1981), English cricketer also known as John Parsons
John T. Parsons (1913–2007), pioneer in Numerical control for machine tools
Jack Parsons (rocket engineer) (John Whiteside Parsons, 1914–1952), American rocket propulsion researcher and occultist
John Anthony Parsons (1938–2004), British sports journalist (mainly Tennis) and author
Johnny Parsons (born 1944), American racecar driver
John Parsons (footballer, born 1875) (1875–1960), Spanish footballer
John Parsons (footballer, born 1950), Welsh footballer
John Parsons (criminal) (born 1971), American FBI Ten Most Wanted fugitive who has been captured
John Parsons (Inspector General), Inspector General for the Global Fund to Fight AIDS, Tuberculosis and Malaria
John Parsons (jockey), British jockey
John Parsons (physician) (1742–1785), English physician
John Robert Parsons (c. 1825–1909), Irish photographer and painter
Sir John Parsons (accountant), British accountant and courtier
John Richard Parsons, English writer and artist

See also
Jack Parsons (disambiguation)